Covington Plantation House, also known as John Wall Covington House, is a historic plantation house located near Rockingham, Richmond County, North Carolina.  It was built about 1850, and is a two-story, three bay, frame dwelling in the Italianate style.  It features a low-pitched bracketed gable roofs, wide eaves, and a -story central projection.

It was listed on the National Register of Historic Places in 1980.

References

Plantation houses in North Carolina
Houses on the National Register of Historic Places in North Carolina
Italianate architecture in North Carolina
Houses completed in 1850
Houses in Randolph County, North Carolina
National Register of Historic Places in Richmond County, North Carolina
U.S. Route 1